HMS Paulina was a British Royal Navy 16-gun brig-sloop of the Seagull class launched in December 1805 for cruising. She had a relatively uneventful career before she was sold in 1816.

Career
Commander John Richard Lumley commissioned Paulina in January 1806 for cruising. On 10 April she shared with HMS Jamaica in the capture of the Algema Belang. On 28 May Paulina and Quebec were again or still in company and shared in the capture of the Frau Geziner. Then on 29 June Paulina was in company with  when she captured the Die Gebroeders, Ocken, master.

In January 1807 she served with Sir John Stopford's squadron in the North Sea. On 22 August she was in company with  when they captured the Danish vessel Sally. The next day Paulina was one of six British warships that shared in the capture of the Danish vessel Speculation. Then in September Paulina was part of the fleet under Admiral Gambier that attacked  Copenhagen.

Lumley sailed her for the Mediterranean on 13 February 1808. Commander Westby Perceval replaced Lumley in 1809. Perceval sailed Paulina for the Mediterranean on 4 September 1812.

In April 1813 Commander Rowland Mainwaring took command, again for the Mediterranean. There he obtained restitution of two merchant vessels that an American privateer had taken to Tripoli. Paulina remained at Tripoli, preventing the privateer from escaping and committing further depredations, until the cessation of hostilities between the United States and Britain.

Fate
Paulina was paid off in 1815. The Navy offered her for sale on 18 April 1816 at Deptford. She was sold there on 30 May 1816 for £700.

Notes

Citations

References
 
 
 

 

Brig-sloops of the Royal Navy
1805 ships